The Zotye 2008 is a small 5-door SUV produced by Zotye Auto in Zhejiang, China. A facelifted version is sold as the Zotye 5008, and is known in export markets as Nomad and Hunter. The car is named in honour of the 2008 Summer Olympics in Beijing and also goes by the model project number XS6402. 

It was reported that Zotye had bought the tools and parts of the first generation Terios model from Daihatsu Taiwan when Daihatsu launched the second generation. Daihatsu Terios is sold in China as the Huali Dario which is made by the Tianjin FAW.

A facelifted Zotye 5008 was produced as the Zotye T200 from 2013 with a new front and rear, and a revised interior. Production for the T200 ended in 2016.

Specification

Engine designs were  purchased from Daihatsu,  uses a range of Mitsubishi-derived fuel-injected 4-cylinder engines dubbed 4G13 and 4G15.

The 2008 is fitted with a 1.3L, producing 65 kW and 115Nm and can reach a top speed of 140kmh.

The 5008 is available with a choice of 4-cylinder 16-valve engines and made in Japan, 1.3L or 1.5L or 1.6L engines, with manual or automatic transmission, CVT on the 1.5L. The 1.3 produces 68 kW and 113Nm, and the 1.5 produces 78 kW and 134Nm, and can reach a top speed of 145kmh.

Export markets
The car was launched in various overseas markets including South Africa in 2008. Initially sold as the Nomad with 1.3L and 1.5L engines,  it is now sold as the facelifted Hunter and is powered by the same engine as the 1.5L 5008, and is rear-drive only despite its off-roader appearance.

References

 Inside Story – Double Trouble. Auto Express, 15 March 2006, page 46

External links
 Zotye Auto RX6400
 Zotye South Africa
 China Car Times portal on Zotye news

Cars of China
Zotye T200
Mini sport utility vehicles
All-wheel-drive vehicles
Cars introduced in 2005
2010s cars